Miconia crebribullata is a species of plant in the family Melastomataceae. It is endemic to Ecuador.  Its natural habitat is subtropical or tropical humid montane forests.

References

crebribullata
Endemic flora of Ecuador
Vulnerable flora of South America
Taxonomy articles created by Polbot